is an historic temple in Bungotakada, Ōita Prefecture, Japan. The current buildings are the Edo-period Hondō and an exhibition hall dating to 1955. Inside are nine Heian-period statues that have been designated Important Cultural Properties.

Statues
 Seated wooden statue of Amida Nyorai (Gohonzon)
 Wooden statue of Daiitoku Myōō seated on a cow
 Triad of Fudō Myōō
 Four Guardian Kings

See also
 Japanese sculpture
 Fuki-ji
 Kumano magaibutsu
 Ōita Prefectural Museum of History

References

External links
  Maki Ōdō (homepage)

Buddhist temples in Oita Prefecture
Important Cultural Properties of Japan